Proverbidioms is an oil painting by American artist T. E. Breitenbach depicting over 300 common proverbs, catchphrases, and clichés such as "You are what you eat", "a frog in the throat", and "kicked the bucket". It is painted on a 45 by 67 inch wooden panel and was completed in 1975 after two years work, when the artist was 24. The included sayings are painted quite literally and appear comical and bizarre, especially if one does not at first realize what the painting is about. For example, "You are what you eat" is represented in the painting by a carrot eating a carrot. The painting also contains hidden social commentary, and a reference to Pieter Bruegel the Elder (a favorite of the artist) who did a 1559 painting of Dutch proverbs. The title Proverbidioms is a simple portmanteau word combining "proverb" with "idioms".

History
Proverbidioms was completed in 1975 and published by Breitenbach as a poster in 1980, along with the list of included sayings. It remains in print to this day as it has proven quite popular. Several counterfeit posters have turned up over the years. In 1988, Proverbidioms was published as a jigsaw puzzle by Bits & Pieces and then by SunsOut, and is still in print. It has been licensed for other products as well. It has appeared as part of the set decoration on the TV shows Beverly Hills, 90210, As the World Turns, and on a Disney pilot.

Proverbidioms is used extensively in education to teach about proverbs in classrooms, in corporate creativity workshops, in teaching the deaf, and in teaching English to foreign students. The Canadian Institute of English and the Watchtower Society in particular have taken the posters to over 100 countries for this last-mentioned purpose.

The artist painted additional versions of this title along with related themed paintings.

In 2011 Breitenbach published an eBook titled Proverbidioms: All the Answers & Trivia. This is the first time that location maps were provided for all the idioms included in the Proverbidioms series of paintings, and in the themed paintings. The artist also reveals background information and illustrates the creation process for these large works. 

In 2012 an iPad app was made using the paintings.

List of paintings in the Proverbidioms series
 (1975) Proverbidioms 
 (1977) Proverbidioms II 
 (1999) Ultimate Proverbidioms 
 (2007) Proverbidioms IV: Who Missed the Boat?

Related paintings
 (1983) Catchpenny 
 (1985) Housecalls 
 (1989) Computerese 
 (1991) Sporttease 
 (1992) Shakespearience 
 (1994) Eats 
 (1996) Things of the Garden 
 (2006) A Picture of Health

References
 A History of Proverbidioms 
 Scherbeck, Bastian (2007). Proverbium: Yearbook of International Proverb Scholarship Volume 24:2007. The Proverb World of Thom E. Breitenbach: An Analysis of Proverbidioms, pp 335–367. The University of Vermont.  
 Scherbeck, Bastian (2005). "Von Bruegel bis Breitenbach: Sprichwortdarstellungen im Wandel der Jahrhunderte" 
 Mieder, Wolfgang (2008). Proverbs Speak Louder Than Words. The University of Vermont. pp 267–269. 
 Pinkney, Barbara. "Artist thrives by trying new forms of expression". The Business Review - March 4, 2005

External links
T. E. Breitenbach's Website
Proverbidioms, The Art of T. E. Breitenbach - A Documentary
An Illustrated Journal About the Creation of Proverbidioms Version IV
A History of Proverbidioms

1975 paintings
Paintings by T. E. Breitenbach
Proverbs
Idioms